Denys Fomin ( (born July 21, 1986) is a Ukrainian volleyball player, a member of the Ukraine men's national volleyball team and Epicentr-Podoliany.

Career
Denys Fomin started his professional career in Lokomotyv Kharkiv.

He was a member of the Ukraine men's national volleyball team in 2019 Men's European Volleyball Championship.

Sporting achievements

Clubs 
Ukrainian Championship:
 x8  2009/2010, 2010/11, 2011/12, 2012/13, 2013/14, 2014/15, 2015/16, 2016/2017
Ukrainian Cup:
 x7  2009/2010, 2010/11, 2011/12, 2012/13, 2013/14, 2014/15, 2015/16
Ukrainian Supercup:
 x1  2017/18

National Team 
 2017  European League

Individual 
 2017/2018 Best Libero  Ukrainian Cup
 2018/2019 Best Libero  Ukrainian Cup

References

External links

1986 births
Living people
Ukrainian men's volleyball players
VC Lokomotyv Kharkiv players
VC Epitsentr-Podoliany players
Sportspeople from Khmelnytskyi Oblast